Asclepiodorus a Macedonian, son of Timander, was one of the generals of Alexander the Great, and after the conquest of Syria was appointed by Alexander satrap of that country. In 328 BC, he led reinforcements from Syria to Alexander in eastern Asia, and there became involved in the conspiracy which was formed by Hermolaus against the life of the king. He seems to be the same as the one whom Antigonus, in 316, made satrap of Persia;  but he must be distinguished from an Asclepiodorus, a general of Cassander, mentioned by Diodorus.

Ascepiodorus was also secretary of Eurydice III of Macedon and an appointed trierarch of Nearchus in 326.

Citations

References
Who's who in the age of Alexander the Great: prosopography of Alexander's empire, 2006, page 58, 

Ancient Greek generals
Conspirators against Alexander the Great
Generals of Alexander the Great
Ancient Macedonian generals
Trierarchs of Nearchus' fleet
4th-century BC Greek people
Macedonian royal secretaries